The 1996 James Madison Dukes football team represented James Madison University in the 1996 NCAA Division I-AA football season.

Schedule

Roster

References

James Madison
James Madison Dukes football seasons
James Madison Dukes football